I.C.P. may refer to:

Insane Clown Posse, an American hip hop duo from Detroit, Michigan
ICP srl, an Italian manufacturer of wiring harnesses, automotive brake wear indicators and aircraft